Mohammed Abdur Rahiman Sahib (1898 – 23 April 1945) was an Indian freedom fighter, Muslim leader,  scholar, and politician from Kerala. He served as president of Kerala Pradesh Congress Committee(Malabar) in 1939.

Early life and education 
Sahib was born at Azhikode, Kodungallur, Thrissur District in 1898 in the Kingdom of Cochin, India. He completed his schooling at Veniyambadi and Calicut. He attended college at Madras and Aligarh but discontinued his studies at Aligarh University to participate in Non-co-operation movement and Khilafat movement in Malabar.

Struggles and imprisonments
Following the Moplah Riots of 1921, Sahib worked towards establishing peace in riot affected areas but was arrested and sentenced to two years imprisonment in October 1921 by the British authorities. For his participation in the Salt Satyagraha of 1930 where he participated in the breaking of the salt law on the Calicut beach, he was lathicharged and sentenced to nine months rigorous imprisonment and lodged at the Kannur Central Jail.

Editor
Mohammed Abdur Rahiman was editor and publisher of the Malayalam daily Al Ameen which was published from Calicut during 1924–1939. The paper aimed to strengthen the freedom movement and nurture nationalism among the Muslims of Malabar. However conservatives in the community opposed to his progressive views conspired with the colonial authorities to repeatedly disrupt its publication. The paper was finally close down in 1939 by the British authorities. According to a local legend, an anonymous admirer of his offered him valuable jewellery to restart the paper after it closed but he refused it.

Politics
Sahib was a member of Calicut Municipal Council from 1931 to 1934 and the Malabar District Board of Madras Presidency from 1932. He was elected to Madras Presidency from Malappuram constituency in 1937. He became President of Kerala Pradesh Congress Committee (KPCC) and a member of All India Congress Committee (AICC) in 1939. Mohammed Abdur Rahiman always opposed the Two-Nation Theory of the All-India Muslim League and he was the leader of Nationalist Muslims in Kerala. His last days were spent convening meetings and creating awareness among Muslims against the division of India. For this, he suffered a lot from the Muslim League Party in Malabar.

Second World War and Subhas Chandra Bose
Abdur Rahiman Sahib was jailed from 1940 to 1945 by the British Raj. After the release from jail, he returned to Calicut and started active participation in Congress activities. He died on 23 November 1945 aged 47 at Pottashery village near Chennamangallur (in the present-day Kozhikode district) just after addressing a public meeting at Kodiyathur The medical records state that he died of a massive heart attack, but still some others believe that he was poisoned. The Kerala government took over Sahib's house at Eriad to protect it as a Nasrul Islam.

Commemoration 
In 1998, the Department of Posts and Telegraph issued a commemorative stamp in his honour. The Mohammed Abdur Rahiman Memorial Orphanage College and the Indianness Mohammed Abdur Rahiman Sahib Academy, Kozhikode have been named after him. Poet Edasseri Govindan Nair immortalised Mohammed Abdur Rahiman Sahib in his famous poem Muhammed Abdurahiman which is acclaimed for both its poetic and lyrical qualities. The poem refers to historic events and the valiant role he played against the British and the stance he took against partition.
Akkitham Achuthan Namboodiri's poem Maranamillatha Manushyan that dwells on religious amity and the need to imbibe the spirit of the Koran was written in memory of Sahib.

In popular culture
In 2011, the Malayalam film Veeraputhran, based on N.P. Mohammed's book Mohammed Abdurahiman Oru Novel, was released. Directed by P. T. Kunju Muhammed, it had the actor Narain playing Abdur Rahiman Sahib. The movie became controversial after writer Hameed Chennamangaloor alleged it of insinuating that Sahib was poisoned to death while medical reports and Sahib's official biography state that he died of a heart attack. The Indian Union Muslim League also expressed its reservations over its depiction in the film.

References

Further reading
 
 

1898 births
1945 deaths
All India Forward Bloc politicians
Indian autobiographers
Malayali politicians
Indian memoirists
Indian revolutionaries
People from Thrissur district
World War II political leaders
Indian independence activists from Kerala
Indian National Congress politicians from Kerala
Indian prisoners and detainees
Indian Muslims
Aligarh Muslim University alumni
20th-century memoirists